Ischnophanes monocentra is a moth of the family Coleophoridae. It is found in Algeria and Tunisia.

References

Coleophoridae
Moths described in 1891